is a Japanese freestyle skier.

Endo competed in moguls, at the 2010 Winter Olympics. He qualified for the moguls final, ultimately finishing 7th.

As of February 2013, his best showing at the World Championships came in 2011, placing 21st, in the moguls event.

He made his World Cup debut in December 2007. As of February 2013, he has twice won bronze medals in World Cup moguls events, including his first medal at Åre in 2011/12. His best World Cup finish is 8th, also in 2011/12.

World Cup Podiums

References

External links
 JOC Vancouver 2010 official profile 

1990 births
Living people
Olympic freestyle skiers of Japan
Freestyle skiers at the 2010 Winter Olympics
Freestyle skiers at the 2014 Winter Olympics
Freestyle skiers at the 2018 Winter Olympics
Sportspeople from Fukushima Prefecture
Japanese male freestyle skiers